Ernst van Rhyn (born 19 September 1997) is a South African rugby union player for the  in Super Rugby and  in the Currie Cup and the Rugby Challenge. He can play as a lock or a flank.

References

1997 births
Living people
Rugby union flankers
Rugby union locks
Rugby union players from Bellville, South Africa
South Africa Under-20 international rugby union players
South African rugby union players
Stormers players
Western Province (rugby union) players